La corte de faraón is a 1944 Mexican musical comedy film directed by Julio Bracho. It stars Mapy Cortés, Roberto Soto, and Fernando Cortés.

References

External links
 

1944 films
1944 musical comedy films
Mexican black-and-white films
Mexican musical comedy films
1940s Mexican films